(commonly known as Furuno) is a Japanese electronics company whose main products are marine electronics, including marine radar systems, fish finders, and navigational instruments. The company also manufactures global positioning systems and medical equipment, and entered the weather radar market in 2013.

History

Furuno Electric Shokai was founded in Nagasaki, Japan in 1948. The same year, Furuno commercialized the world's first practical fish finder. Manufacturing continued to ramp up as the decade came to a close, and by the mid-1950s, Furuno was producing various Marine supplements, such as early examples of commercial Marine radars. In 1973, Furuno created an early iteration of satellite positioning receivers for vessels at sea. Later that decade, Furuno entered the United States market, establishing an HQ in the United States as Furuno USA. Following this expansion and continued growth, Furuno continued expanding their marine-based radar products. In 2009, Furuno acquired San Francisco based eRide, Inc., a fabless semiconductor company. Following this acquisition, in 2013, Furuno introduced an X-band weather radar, the smallest of its kind. In 2015, the company's GNSS Receiver Modules were used in radio controlled flying quadcopters.

In popular culture
Furuno's marine electronic devices has been featured in Licence to Kill (1989) as product placement.

Gallery

Notes

External links

Furuno Global page 
Furuno Global page 
Furuno Galicia (in Spanish)
  Wiki collection of bibliographic works on Furuno

Electronics companies of Japan
Defense companies of Japan
Global Positioning System
Fishing equipment manufacturers
Avionics companies
Marine electronics
Navigation system companies
Radar manufacturers
Health care companies of Japan
Companies listed on the Tokyo Stock Exchange
Companies based in Hyōgo Prefecture
Electronics companies established in 1938
1938 establishments in Japan
Japanese brands